Cathedral is an educational television miniseries of five episodes first broadcast in 2005 by the BBC.  It describes the construction of five cathedrals in the United Kingdom: Canterbury Cathedral, Lincoln Cathedral, Winchester Cathedral, St. Giles' Cathedral, and York Minster.

The show features historical re-enactments using actors and CGI.

External links

2005 British television series debuts
2005 British television series endings
2000s British documentary television series
BBC television documentaries
2000s British television miniseries
English-language television shows